Rafael Cedeño Hernández is a Mexican imprisoned drug trafficker who was a high-level leader of La Familia Michoacana, a drug cartel based in the Mexican state of Michoacán.  He was the successor of Alberto Espinoza Barrón, a drug trafficker who was arrested on 31 December 2008 by the Mexican authorities.

His drug cartel, La Familia Michoacana uses murder and torture to quash rivals, while building a social base in the Mexican state of Michoacán.  It was the fastest-growing cartel in the country's drug war, and is a religious cult-like group that celebrates family values, and justifies murder as "divine justice".

Rafael Cedeño was arrested on 20 April 2009 during a raid at a baptism party for a baby born to a cartel member.

References

Living people
La Familia Michoacana traffickers
Mexican prisoners and detainees
Mexican crime bosses
People from Michoacán
People of the Mexican Drug War
Year of birth missing (living people)